The commune of Mabanda is a commune of Makamba Province in southern Burundi. The capital lies at Mabanda.

References

Communes of Burundi
Makamba Province